Fuse Top 20 Countdown was a weekly music countdown show on American TV network Fuse. It is hosted by Allison Hagendorf and Juliya Chernetsky and brings viewers the latest music news, videos and musician and celebrity interviews.

List of #1s 
2010:

2011: 

2012:

Fuse (TV channel) original programming
American music chart television shows
2010s American music television series
2010 American television series debuts
2012 American television series endings